Passion is a 1925 German silent drama film directed by Richard Eichberg and starring Otto Gebühr, Lilian Harvey and Camilla von Hollay. Harvey was by this time a rising star, and followed it with her breakthrough film Love and Trumpets released the same year.

The film's art direction was by Siegfried Wroblewsky and Jacek Rotmil.

Cast
 Otto Gebühr as Olaf von Hallbek
 Lilian Harvey as Hella von Gilsa
 Camilla von Hollay as Ilse
 Henri Peters-Arnolds as Detlev
 Edda Stevens as Maria
 Dina Gralla as Pepi Gschwandner
 Owen Gorin as Bernd Arvig
 Hermann Picha as Waldemar Bornemann
 Kurt Vespermann as Rudi Anthofer
 Lydia Potechina as Helene Odanski

References

Bibliography

External links

1925 films
1925 drama films
Films of the Weimar Republic
German silent feature films
German drama films
Films directed by Richard Eichberg
German black-and-white films
Silent drama films
1920s German films
1920s German-language films